The Deventer–Almelo railway is an important Dutch railway line, that connects Deventer with Almelo, Netherlands.

History

The railway was opened by the Koninklijke Nederlandsche Locaalspoorweg-Maatschappij (KNLS) on 1 September 1888, with construction starting in 1887. When the line opened it offered a direct link to Germany via the Almelo-Salzbergen railway. The line was electrified in 1951.

Route

The line leaves Deventer in an easterly direction towards Almelo, shortly after leaving, the Staatslijn A to Zutphen leaves in a southerly direction. The line continues travelling through the countryside and a few towns. At Wierden the line from Zwolle joins on and the line continues. On approaching Almelo the line from Mariënberg also joins. The station arrives at Almelo, where the railway becomes the Almelo-Salzbergen railway continues east.

Train services
The Deventer–Almelo railway is used by the following passenger services:

 International services on the whole line (Schiphol - Berlin)
 Intercity services on the whole line (Schiphol/The Hague/Rotterdam - Enschede)
 Stoptrein services on the whole line (Apeldoorn - Enschede)

Train types
A wide variety of trains can be found regularly on the Almelo-Salzbergen railway:

 NS Class 1700 on the Schiphol - Berlin service on the whole line
 NS Koploper on the Schiphol/The Hague/Rotterdam - Enschede on the whole line
 NS Sprinter on the Apeldoorn - Enschede service on the whole line
 NS Buffel on the Zwolle - Enschede service between Wierden and Almelo

There are also large numbers of freight trains operating along the line.

Gallery

Standard gauge railways in the Netherlands
Deventer
Railway lines opened in 1888